Bay Önder is a 1934 Turkish-language opera by Necil Kazım Akses. It was one of a group of operas commissioned by Atatürk as part of his cultural transformation.

References

Turkish-language operas
1934 operas
Operas
Operas based on plays
One-act operas